Perutz Stadion is a multi-use stadium in Pápa, Hungary.  It is currently used mostly for football matches and is the home ground of Lombard-Pápa TFC.  The stadium is able to hold 5,000 people.

External links
Perutz Stadion at magyarfutball.hu

Varkerti